Ibrahim Khalil Bala (1947 - 7 July 1981), also known as Nawab Bala, was a Bangladeshi politician who was a member of parliament. Khalil was a founding member of the Bangladesh Muslim League, serving as the party's president from 1969 to 1971.

Early life and education
Khalil was born in 1947, to the Bengali Muslim Bala family of Sakhipur in Faridpur District. He undertook his education at the University of Dhaka where he also served as the first general secretary of the Haji Muhammad Mohsin Hall student council. He played an important role in the Eleven Points Programme against the President of Pakistan Ayub Khan. Khalil married Begum Shamsunnahar. He also served as founding president of the Bangladesh Youth Muslim League.

Career 
Khalil became the whip of the Bangladesh Muslim League. He stood up for the 1979 Bangladeshi general elections as a Bangladesh Muslim League candidate for the Faridpur-17 constituency.

Death 
Khalil died at 7pm on 7 July 1981 in London, United Kingdom due to illness. In his honour, the Ibrahim Khalil Memorial Council was established.

References 

Bangladesh Muslim League politicians
1947 births
1981 deaths
2nd Jatiya Sangsad members
University of Dhaka alumni
People from Shariatpur District